NGC 3344 is a relatively isolated barred spiral galaxy located 22.5 million light years away in the constellation Leo Minor. This galaxy belongs to the group known as the Leo spur, which is a branch of the Virgo Supercluster. NGC 3344 has the morphological classification (R)SAB(r)bc, which indicates it is a weakly barred spiral galaxy that exhibits rings and moderate to loosely wound spiral arms. There is both an inner and outer ring, with the prominent arms radiating outward from the inner ring and the slightly elliptical bar being situated inside. At the center of the bar is an HII nucleus with an angular diameter of about 3″. NGC 3344 hosted supernova SN 2012fh, which was shown to likely be a Type Ib or Type Ic.

References

External links
 
 Galex image of NGC 3344

Intermediate spiral galaxies
Leo Minor
3344
05840
31968
17850406